Brian Sheehan is an American actor who has appeared on screen since 1980. His screen debut came when he appeared in the TV serial Reunion. He has appeared in films including Teen Wolf, Top Gun, Total Force and Recoil. Sheehan has also appeared on TV, in series including The Greatest American Hero, Knots Landing, and L.A. Law.

Filmography

Film

Television

External links

American male actors
Living people
Year of birth missing (living people)